Gylve Fenris Nagell (born Leif Nagell; 28 November 1971), known professionally as Fenriz, is a Norwegian musician, part-time music journalist and online radio host (with the show "Radio Fenriz") who is best known as being one half of the extreme metal duo Darkthrone, alongside Nocturno Culto. Although primarily a drummer and songwriter, he has also played bass, guitar and done vocals for Darkthrone and several other metal bands. Fenriz is famed for his encyclopedic knowledge of metal music, his eager promotion of underground bands and the DIY ethic, and his rejection of the "showbiz side of the music industry". Fenriz was also the studio drummer for doom metal band Valhall, and has had several solo projects, including the folk black metal project Isengard and the dark ambient project Neptune Towers.

Biography 
Fenriz's first exposure to heavy metal music came when he was a child and received Uriah Heep's album Sweet Freedom from his uncle for his birthday. At age 16, Fenriz dropped out of school and began working full time to support his music. In 1986 he co-founded the death metal band Black Death with Ivar Enger and Anders Risberget. By 1988 they had been joined by Ted Skjellum (Nocturno Culto) and were renamed Darkthrone. After releasing their first death metal album in 1991, the band changed style and became one of the leading bands in the early Norwegian black metal scene. Fenriz said he had a passive interest in Bathory and Celtic Frost, but claims that he did not understand the "darkness" of black metal until hearing a song by the Hungarian band Tormentor. The second album released by Darkthrone, A Blaze in the Northern Sky, recorded in August 1991 at Creative Studios but not released until February 1992, is regarded as one of the most important albums that defined the black metal genre. Darkthrone were not involved in the church burnings and murders carried out by some other members of the scene, and Fenriz has denounced the "hype" surrounding it.

Since 1993, Darkthrone have been a duo of Fenriz and Nocturno Culto. Fenriz recorded all instruments on their albums Transilvanian Hunger (1994) and Panzerfaust (1995). From the late 1980s to the mid 1990s Fenriz also founded several solo projects, including the folk black metal project Isengard and the dark ambient project Neptune Towers. He was also the drummer for the band Valhall on their three studio albums. In the 1990s he co-founded the folk metal band Storm with Sigurd Wongraven, which released one album.

Both he and Nocturno have refused to play live since the 1990s. In 2004, they turned down a nomination for a Norwegian Alarm Award for their album Sardonic Wrath. Fenriz said, "we have no interest in being part of the glitter and showbiz side of the music industry". Fenriz (alongside Varg Vikernes) is the principal focus of the 2008 black metal documentary film Until The Light Takes Us.

In 2016, it was widely reported that Fenriz had been elected to his local municipal council, Oppegård. He was elected for a four-year term as a substitute councillor for the Liberal Party, explaining that he would "have to step in when the usual people who go to the big meetings are sick or something". Fenriz said: "They called and asked if I wanted to be on the list [of backup representatives]. I said yeah, thinking I would be like 18th on the list and I wouldn't really have to do anything". His "campaign" was a photo of him holding his cat with the caption "Please Don't Vote For Me".

Fenriz lives in his hometown of Kolbotn. According to The Guardian, Fenriz "has long been a hero in the underground scene" and "has an obsession with unearthing new music and promoting it with rabid enthusiasm". The heavy metal magazine Iron Fist noted he has a reputation as a "walking metal encyclopedia". He is a part-time music journalist and hosts a monthly online radio show on NTS called "Radio Fenriz". He created the "Band of the Week" blog from which the acts for the underground metal festival Live Evil are sourced. Fenriz has famously been working part-time in the postal service since the late 1980s, which he says allows him to spend many hours each week listening to new music. He has also appeared on a Norwegian television show about hiking in forests.

Musical projects 
 Darkthrone – drums, bass, rhythm guitar, vocals, lyrics (1986—present)
 Valhall – drums (1987–1989, 1993–?, 2007—present)
 Fenriz' Red Planet – everything (1993–?) – solo project
 Isengard – everything (1989–1995) – solo project
 Neptune Towers – everything (1993–1995) – solo project
 Dødheimsgard – bass and additional vocals (1994–1995)
 Storm – drums, vocals (1995) – (with Satyr from Satyricon and Kari Rueslåtten)
 Eibon – drums (1999) (with Satyr from Satyricon, Killjoy from Necrophagia, and Phil Anselmo from Pantera)
 Fuck You All – bass (2002)
 Regress FF – everything (1994) – solo project

Discography 

 Note: All Darkthrone lyrics are written by Fenriz, with the exception of Transilvanian Hunger tracks 5–8, Panzerfaust track 6, and the Total Death album. Songwriting is usually split between Fenriz and Nocturno Culto, but varies from album to album.

Guest appearances 
 Ulver – vocals on "A Song of Liberty Plates 25–27" from the album Themes from William Blake's The Marriage of Heaven and Hell (1998)
 Satyricon – percussion (tracks 4–5) on Rebel Extravaganza (1999)
 Aura Noir – additional vocals on Dreams like Deserts (1995), Increased Damnation (2000) and The Merciless (2004)
 Thorns – vocals and drums (track 9) on  Thorns vs. Emperor (2011) (recorded sometime between 1998 and 1999)
 Red Harvest – backing vocals on "Absolut Dunkel:heit" from the album Cold Dark Matter (2000)
 Cadaver Inc. – additional vocals on Discipline (2001)
 Audiopain – additional lyrics on Revel in Desecration (2002)
 Trashcan Darlings – additional vocals on "Dehumanizer" from the album Episode 1: The Lipstick Menace (2002)

References

External links 

 Fenriz on Encyclopaedia Metallum
 Fenriz interviewed by Travis Jeppesen

1971 births
Living people
Black metal singers
Norwegian heavy metal bass guitarists
Norwegian male bass guitarists
Norwegian heavy metal singers
Norwegian black metal musicians
Norwegian heavy metal drummers
Male drummers
Norwegian multi-instrumentalists
Norwegian rock bass guitarists
Norwegian rock singers
Norwegian songwriters
Place of birth missing (living people)
Liberal Party (Norway) politicians
21st-century Norwegian singers
21st-century Norwegian drummers
21st-century Norwegian bass guitarists
21st-century Norwegian male singers